The Beloved Brat is a 1938 American comedy-drama film directed by Arthur Lubin and starring Bonita Granville, Dolores Costello, and Donald Crisp. The screenplay was written by Lawrence Kimble from an original story by Jean Negulesco.

Plot
Roberta Morgan has wealthy parents who give her plenty of material possessions but who basically ignore her. She acts out and torments the family butler Jenkins. The only person to take  notice of her thirteenth birthday is her father's secretary, Williams.

She makes friends with a black boy, Pinkie White, and visits his home. She is impressed by the love Pinkie's mother, Mrs White, shows Pinkie and his sister Arabella. Roberta invites Pinkie to dinner to say thank you and Jenkins angrily throws out Pinkie.

Roberta's parents go away and Roberta starts behaving even more badly. Jenkins locks her in her room. She sets fire to it and escapes. Jenkins tracks her to Pinkie's house. On the way home in the car, they argue and Roberta grabs the steering wheel causing the car to swerve into an oncoming car and kill the driver.

Roberta tells the police that Jenkins was drinking and the butler is sentenced to prison for manslaughter. Guilt ridden she confesses that she made it up.

Roberta is sentenced to a special girls' school run by Helen Cosgrove. Helen manages to reform Roberta by getting her to help with younger students. When Roberta is allowed to return home, she refuses to leave. Her parents hear about this and change their ways.

Cast
 Bonita Granville as Roberta Morgan
 Dolores Costello as Helen Cosgrove
 Donald Crisp as John Morgan
 Donald Briggs as Jerome Williams
 Natalie Moorhead as Evelyn Morgan
 Lucile Gleason as Miss Brewster
 Leo Gorcey as Spike Matz
 Emmett Vogan as Mr. Jenkins
 Loia Cheaney as Mrs. Jenkins
 Paul Everton as Judge Henry Harris
 Bernice Pilot as Mrs. White
 Stymie Beard as Pinkie White
 Meredith White as Arabella White
 Mary Doyle as Miss Mitchell
 Ellen Lowe as Anna
 Gloria Fisher as Boots

Uncredited
 Betty Compson as Eleanor Sparks
 Sarah Edwards as Miss Brundage
 Doris Bren as Jackie
 Carmencita Johnson as Estelle
 Ottola Nesmith as Mrs. Higgins
 Priscilla Lyon as Sylvia
 Lottie Williams as Marie
 Patsy Mitchell as Betty Mae
 Douglas Wood as Mr. Butler
 William Worthington as Dr. Reynolds
 Jessie Arnold as Nurse
 Mary Avery as Teacher
 Isabelle LaMal as Teacher
 Louise Bates as Mrs. Morgan's Guest
 Jesse Graves as Butler at Party
 Gordon Hart as Trial Judge
 Glen Cavender as Fireman
 Jack Mower as Fireman
 Cliff Saum as Fireman
 Al Duvall as First Cab Driver
 John Harron as Second Cab Driver
 Monte Vandergrift as Police Officer
 Victor Wong as Gardener

Production
The film was initially titled Too Much of Everything. Dolores Costello signed in September 1937. It was her comeback picture for Warners. In November the title was changed to Girls on Probation. Arthur Lubin directed in November 1937. The title was finally changed to Beloved Brat in January 1938.

Reception
Diabolique magazine in 2019 described it as "an entertaining star vehicle for Bonita Granville, playing a poor little rich girl who sets her room on fire, accidentally kills a motorist by grabbing the wheel of a speeding car, sends the racist family butler to prison for the crime by perjuring herself on the stand, is sent to reform school and… actually reforms... of cultural interest in that it shows a black mother character to be a far superior parent to Granville's parents, and Granville's best friend is a black boy."

References

External links

The Beloved Brat at Letterbox DVD

1938 films
1938 comedy-drama films
American black-and-white films
American comedy-drama films
Films directed by Arthur Lubin
First National Pictures films
Warner Bros. films
1930s English-language films
1930s American films